Chalce Montes is a mountain range on the planet Mars. The name refers to the Martian albedo feature Chalce, that was named after the Greek island Chalki.

See also
 List of mountains on Mars

References 

Mountain ranges on Mars